Sciotropis lattkei is a species of damselfly in the family Megapodagrionidae. It is endemic to Venezuela.  Its natural habitats are subtropical or tropical moist lowland forests and rivers. It is threatened by habitat loss.

References

Sources

Endemic fauna of Venezuela
Megapodagrionidae
Odonata of South America
Insects described in 1994
Taxonomy articles created by Polbot